Mary Astrid Segovia Tuminez (born 8 August 1964) is the seventh president of Utah Valley University (UVU) in Orem, Utah, and its first female president.

Early life and education 

Astrid Tuminez was born in a small island village in Iloilo province, the Philippines. Though raised in extreme poverty as the sixth of seven children, she received a scholarship at the age of five to attend a private school run by Catholic nuns, along with her older siblings. She credits much of her success and accomplishments to this pivotal moment in her life, and is passionate in her belief that education enables individuals to fulfill their dreams and maximize their potential:

Tuminez first came to the United States at age 18 in 1982 on a student visa. That is when she began her study at Brigham Young University (BYU). She earned a bachelor's degree in Russian and international relations from BYU, a master's degree in Soviet Studies  from Harvard University, and a Ph.D. in political science and government from the Massachusetts Institute of Technology. She was a program officer at the Carnegie Corporation of New York, focused on grantmaking in democratization, conflict prevention, and non-proliferation of weapons of mass destruction. Tuminez joined AIG Global Investments as a research director and ran the Moscow office of the Harvard Project on Strengthening Democratic Institutions, where she worked with leading reformers of communism.

Career 
As senior research consultant to the U.S. Institute of Peace, she assisted in peace negotiations between the Moro Islamic Liberation Front and the Philippine government from 2003 to 2007 and is member and former adjunct fellow of the Council on Foreign Relations.

In her role as Vice-Dean of Research and Assistant Dean of Executive Education in the Lee Kuan Yew School of Public Policy (National University of Singapore), she trained more than 2,000 private sector professionals in leadership and organizational change in addition to leading marketing, fundraising, and grants administration for the school.

She was previously Microsoft's regional director for corporate, external and legal affairs for Southeast Asia, leading a team supporting 15 markets. Her role was to strengthen government relations, cultivate corporate citizenship, and enhance understanding of trending issues shaping regulation and policy, specifically drivers of inclusive growth in the 4th Industrial Revolution.

In 2013, Tuminez was named a Top 100 Global Influencer by the Filipina Women's Network of the United States. Tuminez was a director of the Philippines' second largest bank, the Bank of the Philippine Islands, and boardmember of Singapore American School and ASKI Global, an NGO which trains and finances entrepreneurship among Asian women migrant laborers. She was ASKI's Chair of the Board until 2017.

In 2018 she was appointed President of Utah Valley University, succeeding Matthew S. Holland, son of Jeffrey R. Holland, a member of the LDS Church's Quorum of the Twelve Apostles. At the time, Tuminez was resident in Singapore.

Personal 
Tuminez is fluent in English, Russian, Hiligaynon (Ilonggo), French, Tagalog and Spanish. Tuminez is married and has three children. She is a member of the Church of Jesus Christ of Latter-day Saints and joined at age 11.

Tuminez enjoys running and has completed one marathon and four half-marathons. She had 11 years of martial arts training in a system called Tan's Dazzling Hands while living in New York City. She is a 'super fan' of the UVU wrestling team.

Selected publications 
Rising to the Top? A Report on Women's Leadership in Asia, A Report from the Lee Kuan Yew School of Public Policy and Asia Society, launched at the April 2012 Women Leaders of New Asia Summit, Shanghai and Zhenjiang, 18–20 April 2012.
Russian Nationalism Since 1856. Ideology and the Making of Foreign Policy (Lanham, MD: Rowman and Littlefield, Inc., 2000).
Asia and the Global Economic Crisis, A Task Force Report, Lee Kuan Yew School of Public Policy, National University of Singapore, 12 March 2009 [written with other Task Force members].
Russia in Southeast Asia: A New "Asian Moment?" (with Hong, Mark), in ASEANRUSSIA Foundation and Future Prospects, Victor Sumsky, Mark Hong and Amy Lugg, eds. (Singapore: ISEAS Publishing, 2012), pp. 43–55.
Reframing Conceptual Approaches to Interpret Sex Worker Health (with Joseph D. Tucker), Journal of Infectious Diseases 2011:204 (SUPPL 5) S1206-S1210.
The Problem That Has Been Named Global-is-Asian (Lee Kuan Yew School of Public Policy), No. 11, July–September 2011, pp. 34–37.

References

1964 births
Living people
Utah Valley University faculty
Brigham Young University alumni
MIT School of Humanities, Arts, and Social Sciences alumni
Harvard Graduate School of Arts and Sciences alumni
Filipino emigrants to the United States
People from Iloilo
American expatriates in Singapore
American expatriates in Russia
Converts to Mormonism
Filipino Latter Day Saints
American Latter Day Saints